Peter Thuesen may refer to:

 Peter J. Thuesen (born 1971), American religious scholar
 Peter Thuesen (sport shooter) (born 1978), Danish sport shooter